City of Bones may refer to:
 City of Bones (Connelly novel), a novel by American crime author Michael Connelly
 City of Bones (Clare novel), a 2007 young adult novel by Cassandra Clare
 The Mortal Instruments: City of Bones, the film adaptation of Clare's novel
 City of Bones, a 1995 novel by Martha Wells